Sidney Hill Cottage Homes, whose official name is Sidney Hill Churchill Wesleyan Cottage Homes, is a Grade II listed estate of Wesleyan cottage homes in the village of Churchill in North Somerset. It was opened in December 1907 to provide furnished accommodation for people in need. Designed in an Arts and Crafts Vernacular style by Thomas Ball Silcock and Samuel Sebastian Reay  of Silcock and Reay, architects at Bath and London, twelve cottages were constructed on three sides of a quadrangle, with landscaped gardens. The third, or south side, is enclosed by a low terrace wall with wrought iron gates. A large stone sundial, with a spreading base, is set in the centre of the quadrangle. In their original form, each house had a living room, with a small scullery, larder, coal house, and one bedroom with a large storeroom.

Sidney Hill, a wealthy local businessman and benefactor, paid for the construction costs and endowed a fund to maintain the homes. Sidney Hill Churchill Wesleyan Cottage Homes, a registered charitable trust and a member of the National Association of Almshouses, continues to manage the homes and provide accommodation for local people in need. The trust also funds the maintenance of the communal garden and operates the heating system which services the houses.

History
On 12May 1904, Sidney Hill purchased at auction a plot of pasture and arable land in Churchill called "The Vicarage Close" for £500. The plot contained  that consisted of three lots numbered 166, 168, and 169 on the Churchill tithe map. Hill's intention was to build furnished cottage homes (or almshouses) at Vicarage Close for people of advanced years, in difficult circumstances, and without near relatives. This would be Hill's second set of cottage homes after he built and furnished six dwellings known as the Victoria Jubilee Homes at Langford in commemoration of the Golden Jubilee of Queen Victoria.

The homes in Churchill were built by Isaac Ford and Sons of Cheddar, to an Arts and Crafts design by the architects Thomas Ball Silcock and Samuel Sebastian Reay  of Silcock and Reay, at Bath and London. Sidney Hill and Silcock were political allies: Hill was a vicepresident of the Liberal Association in Wells and nominated Silcock as the Liberal candidate for the 1906 General Election. Silcock and Reay's coloured drawing of the homes was sufficiently wellregarded to be included in the 1906 and 1907 Royal Academy Exhibitions.

The cost of the buildings, exclusive of the cost of land, amounted to £11,000, and the furniture in the homes, the trustees' room, and the matron's cottage, amounted to a further £1,915. The gardens and planting cost an additional £900. The homes bear the inscription "The Sidney Hill Churchill Wesleyan Cottage Homes" and were opened in December 1907. The first residents were chosen personally by Sidney Hill with preference given to followers of the Wesleyan movement. Robert Stone, a blacksmith at the forge opposite the homes, had a cottage where the homes were built. The cottage was demolished during construction, and he and his wife became the first family to enter the homes. Each occupant of the homes was given a sufficient weekly sum for maintenance.

On 13January 1908, John Durban Loveless, Sidney Hill's agent, was presented with an illuminated address and silver salver by Silcock and Reay in recognition of his efforts to complete the home. The presentation was made by Silcock, then the Liberal MP for the Wells Division of Somerset, and the address was designed and illuminated by Reay. The land and buildings were gifted to the Sidney Hill Churchill Wesleyan Cottage Homes trust in October 1906. After the death of Sidney Hill in 1908, and four years after the death of his nephew who had succeeded him, Thomas Sidney Hill, his great nephew took over as chair of the trust. Since that time various other local people have been nominated to the board of trustees including, up until this day, many direct descendants of the Hill family.

In 1958, the trust became a member of the National Association of Almshouses, and in January 1962, a registered charitable trust. The occupants were not asked to make a residential contribution until 1972, and since that time, there have been annual increases; now a contribution is made which is comparable with modern rented accommodation. The trust funds the maintenance of the communal garden and operates the heating system which services the houses.

Architecture

They are arranged on three sides of a quadrangle about  square, its open side facing south with a view to woods on the Mendip Hills. The south side is enclosed by a low brick terrace wall coped with stone and ornamented with carved stone vases, and in the centre is a gateway with wrought iron gates giving access to working gardens. Wide stonepaved paths run round the four sides of the quadrangle, the south path is terminated at each end with a large arbour arranged under the main roof, which is supported by oak posts and balustrades, each arbour contained oak seats and tables.

The front of the building faces Front Street in Churchill, and is set back from the road by a courtyard that has lawns and paths with flower borders and trees. A terrace wall of brick with large stone vases separates the courtyard from the road. The courtyard is approached by steps through entrance gates made of wrought iron with a bell turret and weather vane over the central archway.

The north, east, and west sides of the houses have gables and recessed arbours that have arches supported by oak posts. The doorways are constructed from arched oak frames and doors; the doors in the quadrangle have moulded hoods supported by carved corbels. The walls are of sandfaced brick, with handmade red roof tiles, oak window frames with iron casements and lead window glazing. The stone used for the copings, piers and finials is Cotswold stone, a yellow, oolitic Jurassic limestone, that was mined at Temple Guiting quarry, in Gloucestershire, England. It was chosen as its colour would harmonise with the warm tones of the walls and roofs.

In the original design, each house had a living room, with a small scullery, larder, coal house, and a bedroom with a large storeroom. Over the entrance to the quadrangle is a large meeting room, reached by a spiral stone staircase. The room also has a stone fireplace with Hill's motto inscribed on the mantelpiece. The living rooms in the homes had fireplaces set in golden brown bricks with raised hearths of the same material. The bedroom fireplaces had green tile surrounds and tiled hearths, and all the fireplaces had simple oak mantels. A fire guard was provided for each living room, and bells enabled each house to communicate with the others in case of emergency. The homes were furnished with oak furniture designed by Silcock and Reay. In the south west corner of the site a small laundry was built together with outbuildings.

A matron's house was built in the north west corner of the site, adjoining Front Street, containing two sitting rooms, a kitchen, three bedrooms, and a bathroom. The matron's house is listed as a Grade II building by Historic England separately from the other buildings on the site. It is one storey building, with a (now converted) attic, constructed from red brick with a plain tiled roof. The windows have three wooden casements with small leaded panes; those to the attic are under gables. There are two Tudor arched doorways with plank doors to south and east fronts. There is a wooden round arched loggia to the east front and a gabled porch to the south front.

Sundial

A large stone sundial, designed by Silcock and Reay, stands on a base of brick in the centre of the quadrangle, and is listed separately as a Grade II monument by Historic England. It has a limestone mid course and cornice, and a hexagonal stone shaft  metres high, developing from four consoles that have decorative features in lead. A square sundial, with four bronze plates and a ball finial, are affixed to the top of the shaft. John Parish White and Sons of The Pyghtle Works, Bedford, supplied the sundial, decorative lead, stonework and plates. The same company supplied the oak benches that surrounded the base when it was first erected.

There are also four brass bronze plates attached around the base of the sundial that inscribe a quatrain of John Greenleaf Whittier, called "Inscription on a SunDial for Dr. Henry I. Bowditch". Whittier wrote the quatrain originally as an inscription for a sundial plate owned by Dr. Henry Ingersoll Bowditch:

Architectural importance
There is no overarching architectural style within Churchill. However, the Sidney Hill Cottage Homes is unique within the village, with its ornate brick work, ironwork railings and lampposts, large concrete urns, bell tower and weather vane, and in the central courtyard, the sundial. In particular, the gate piers with their carved stone vases and wrought iron gates are an exciting testimony to late Victorian architecture. In contrast, the predominant construction material in the larger, detached Georgian buildings is local stone, interspersed with much older, more traditional cottages, and postwar, detached bungalows and houses. There are a few other structures with distinctive brickwork features in the area that include the Jubilee Clock Tower and Methodist church.

Gallery

See also

Footnotes

References

Further reading

External links

20th-century architecture in the United Kingdom
Almshouses in Somerset
Almshouses
Arts and Crafts architecture in England
Brick buildings and structures
Buildings and structures in North Somerset
Charities based in Somerset
Christian charities
Edwardian architecture
Grade II listed buildings in North Somerset
Houses completed in 1907
Methodism in England
Methodism in the United Kingdom
Sundials